The 2017 Singapore Super Series was the fourth Super Series tournament of the 2017 BWF Super Series. The tournament takes place in Singapore from April 11–16, 2017 with a total purse of $350,000.

Men's singles

Seeds

Top half

Bottom half

Finals

Women's singles

Seeds

Top half

Bottom half

Finals

Men's doubles

Seeds

Top half

Bottom half

Finals

Women's doubles

Seeds

Top half

Bottom half

Finals

Mixed doubles

Seeds

Top half

Bottom half

Finals

References

External links
Tournament Link

Singapore
Singapore Open (badminton)
2017 in Singaporean sport